Alexis Tsafas (born 1956), is a Greek filmmaker and producer. He has contributed vastly to the cinema of Cape Verde by making critically acclaimed films, A menina dos olhos grandes, Tunnel and Zenaida.

Filmography

See also
 Festival de Baía das Gatas

References

External links
 

Living people
Greek film directors
Film people from Athens
1956 births